Stanislav Lugailo (1 January 1938 – 11 April 2021) was a Ukrainian volleyball player who competed for the Soviet Union in the 1964 Summer Olympics.

In 1964, he was a squad member of the Soviet team which won the gold medal in the Olympic tournament.

He also served as head coach of the women's national team of the Philippines from 1990 to 1993.

References

External links
 profile

1938 births
2021 deaths
Sportspeople from Sukhumi
Soviet men's volleyball players
Ukrainian volleyball coaches
Volleyball coaches of international teams
Olympic volleyball players of the Soviet Union
Volleyball players at the 1964 Summer Olympics
Olympic gold medalists for the Soviet Union
Olympic medalists in volleyball
Russian men's volleyball players
Medalists at the 1964 Summer Olympics
Latvian Academy of Sport Education alumni